Notch Number One is a 1924 American silent Western film directed, produced by and starring Ben F. Wilson. It was released under the Arrow Film Corporation label. It was also known The First Notch. This film survives in the Library of Congress collection.

Cast
 Ben F. Wilson – Tom Watson
 Marjorie Daw – Dorothy Moore
 Merrill McCormick – no name
 Reed Howes – no name
 Billy Lord – Dickie Moore

References

External links
 Notch Number One at IMDb.com
 

1924 films
1924 Western (genre) films
American black-and-white films
Arrow Film Corporation films
Films directed by Ben F. Wilson
Silent American Western (genre) films
1920s American films